Angelo Marotta is an American politician who served as a member of the Medford, Massachusetts city council and the Massachusetts House of Representatives.

Early life
Marotta was born on October 16, 1937 in Boston. He attended Medford High School, Mercersburg Academy, and Seton Hall University.

Political career
Marotta began his political career as a member of the Medford city council from 1972 to 1973 he also served as the city's mayor, which also gave him a seat on the Medford school committee.

From 1975 to 1989, Marotta was a member of the Massachusetts House of Representatives. In 1984, Marotta served as the assistant majority leader.

Business career
While serving the House, Marotta worked in real estate and was described as "the most successful condominium developer in [Medford]". By 1987 he had constructed or planned nearly  1,200 condominiums. He specialized in developing, constructing, selling and, occasionally, mortgaging high-rise buildings, mostly in Medford.

Campaign funding conviction
During the 1990 gubernatorial election, Marotta exceeded the maximum amount an individual could contribute to a political campaign in Massachusetts by purchasing $22,000 in money orders under the names of friends and associates. According to a federal prosecutor, Marotta admitted that he hid the donations because the candidate, John Silber, who at the time was expected to win the governor's race, might give him a job. Marotta pled guilty and agreed to six months of house arrest and $35,000 in state and federal fines.

References

1937 births
American real estate businesspeople
American people convicted of campaign finance violations
Mayors of Medford, Massachusetts
Democratic Party members of the Massachusetts House of Representatives
Mercersburg Academy alumni
Seton Hall University alumni
Living people
Massachusetts politicians convicted of crimes